Paquni (Aymara paqu a kind of edible herb, -ni a suffix, "the one with the paqu herbs", Hispanicized spelling Pacuni) is a  mountain in the Potosí Department of Bolivia. It is located in the Antonio Quijarro Province, Tomave Municipality, northeast of the Jatun Mundo Quri Warani volcano.

References 

Mountains of Potosí Department